Yakima ( or ) is a  city in and the county seat of Yakima County, Washington, United States, and the state's 11th-largest city by population. As of the 2020 census, the city had a total population of 96,968 and a metropolitan population of 256,728. The unincorporated suburban areas of West Valley and Terrace Heights are considered a part of greater Yakima.

It is situated in the Yakima Valley, a productive agricultural region noted for apple, wine, and hop production. As of 2011, the Yakima Valley produces 77% of all hops grown in the United States. The name Yakima originates from the Yakama Nation Native American tribe, whose reservation is located south of the city.

History
The Yakama people were the first known inhabitants of the Yakima Valley. In 1805, the Lewis and Clark Expedition came to the area and discovered abundant wildlife and rich soil, prompting the settlement of homesteaders. A Catholic Mission was established in Ahtanum, southwest of present-day Yakima, in 1847. The arrival of settlers and their conflicts with the natives resulted in the Yakima War. The U.S. Army established Fort Simcoe in 1856 near present-day White Swan as a response to the uprising. The Yakamas were defeated and forced to relocate to the Yakama Indian Reservation.

Yakima County was created in 1865. When bypassed by the Northern Pacific Railroad in December 1884, over 100 buildings were moved with rollers and horse teams to the nearby site of the depot. The new city was dubbed North Yakima and was officially incorporated and named the county seat on January 27, 1886. The name was changed to Yakima in 1918. Union Gap was the new name given to the original site of Yakima.

On May 18, 1980, the eruption of Mount St. Helens caused a large amount of volcanic ash to fall on the Yakima area. Visibility was reduced to near-zero conditions that afternoon, and the ash overloaded the city's wastewater treatment plant.

On January 24, 2023, a shooting at a Circle K convenience store in Yakima killed three people. The gunman fled and killed himself with a self-inflicted gunshot wound near a local Target store.

Geography
Yakima is 1095 feet above mean sea level.

Yakima region
The city of Yakima is located in the Upper Valley of Yakima County. The county is geographically divided by Ahtanum Ridge and Rattlesnake Ridge into two regions: the Upper (northern) and Lower (southern) valleys. Yakima is located in the more urbanized Upper Valley, and is the central city of the Yakima Metropolitan Statistical Area.

The unincorporated suburban areas of West Valley and Terrace Heights are considered a part of greater Yakima. Other nearby cities include Moxee, Tieton, Cowiche, Wiley City, Tampico, Gleed, and Naches in the Upper Valley, as well as Wapato, Toppenish, Zillah, Harrah, White Swan, Parker, Buena, Outlook, Granger, Mabton, Sunnyside, and Grandview in the Lower Valley.

Bodies of water
The primary irrigation source for the Yakima Valley, the Yakima River, runs through Yakima from its source at Lake Keechelus in the Cascade Range to the Columbia River at Richland. In Yakima, the river is used for both fishing and recreation. A  walking and cycling trail, a park, and a wildlife sanctuary are located at the river's edge.

The Naches River forms the northern border of the city. Several small lakes flank the northern edge of the city, including Myron Lake, Lake Aspen, Bergland Lake (private) and Rotary Lake (also known as Freeway Lake). These lakes are popular with fishermen and swimmers during the summer.

Climate
Yakima has a cold desert climate (Köppen BWk) with a Mediterranean precipitation pattern. Springtime warming is very gradual, with the average last freeze of the season May 13. Summer days are hot, but the diurnal temperature variation is large, averaging  in July, sometimes reaching as high as  during that season; there are 34 afternoons of maxima reaching  or greater annually and 3.2 afternoons of  maxima. Autumn cooling is very rapid, with the average first freeze of the season occurring on September 30. Due to the city's location in a rain shadow, precipitation, at an average of  annually, is low year-round, but especially during summer.

Demographics

2010 census
As of the census of 2010, there were 91,067 people with 33,074 households, and 21,411 families residing in the city. The population density was 3,350.5 people per square mile. There were 34,829 housing units at an average density of 1,281.4 per square mile. The racial makeup of the city was 67.1% Caucasian, 1.7% African American, 2.0% Native American, 1.5% Asian, 0.1% Pacific Islander, 23.3% from other races, and 4.4% from two or more races. 41.3% were Hispanic or Latino, of any race. 19.1% of the population had a bachelor's degree or higher.

There were 33,074 households, of which 33.2% had children under the age of 18 living with them, 44.7% were married couples living together, 15.7% had a female householder with no husband present, 6.3% had a male householder with no wife present, and 35.3% were non-families. 28.7% of all households were made up of individuals, and 11.9% had someone living alone who was 65 years of age or older. The average household size was 2.68 and the average family size was 3.3.

28.3% of the population was under the age of 18 and 13.1% were 65 years or older. The median age was 33.9 years. 50.7% of the population was female.

The median household income was $39,706. The per capita income was $20,771. 21.3% of the population were below the poverty line.

Economy
Yakima's growth in the 20th century was fueled primarily by agriculture. The Yakima Valley produces many fruit crops, including apples, peaches, pears, cherries, and melons. Many vegetables are also produced, including peppers, corn and beans. Most of the nation's hops, a key ingredient in the production of beer, are also grown in the Yakima Valley. Many of the city's residents have come to the valley out of economic necessity and to participate in the picking, processing, marketing and support services for the agricultural economy.

Downtown Yakima, long the retail hub of the region, has undergone many changes since the late 1990s. Three major department stores, and an entire shopping mall that is now closed, have been replaced by a Whirlpool Corporation facility (shut down in 2011), an Adaptis call center, and several hotels. The region's retail core has shifted to the town of Union Gap to a renovated shopping mall and other new retail businesses. The Downtown Futures Initiative promotes the downtown area as a center for events, services, entertainment, and small, personal shopping experiences. The DFI has provided for street-to-storefront remodeling along Yakima Avenue throughout the entire downtown core, and includes new pedestrian-friendly lighting, water fountains, planters, banner poles, new trees and hanging baskets, and paver-inlaid sidewalks.

Events held downtown include Yakima Downtown New Year's Eve, a Cinco de Mayo celebration, Yakima Live music festival, Yakima Summer Kickoff Party, Fresh Hop Ale Fest, a weekly Farmers' Market, and the Hot Shots 3-on-3 Basketball Tournament.

Over ninety wineries are in the Yakima Valley.

The Yakima Training Center, between Yakima and Ellensburg, is a United States Army training center. It is used primarily for maneuver training and land warrior system testing, and has a live-fire area. Artillery units from the Canadian Armed Forces based in British Columbia, as well as the Japan Ground Self Defense Force, conduct annual training in Yakima. Japanese soldiers train there because it allows for large-scale live-fire maneuvers not available in Japan. Similarly, it is the closest impact area for the Canadian Gunners, the next closest being in Wainwright, Alberta.

Tourism
In the early 2000s, the city of Yakima, in conjunction with multiple city organizations, began revitalization and preservation efforts in its historic downtown area. The Downtown Yakima Futures Initiative was created to make strategic public investments in sidewalks, lighting and landscaping to encourage further development. As a result, local businesses featuring regional produce, wines, and beers, among other products, have returned to the downtown area. Many of these business are located on Front Street, Yakima Avenue and 1st Street.

During the summer, a pair of historic trolleys operate along five miles (8 km) of track of the former Yakima Valley Transportation Company through the Yakima Gap connecting Yakima and Selah. The Yakima Valley Trolleys organization, incorporated in 2001, operates the trolleys and a museum for the City of Yakima.

Arts and culture

Cultural activities and events take place throughout the year. The Yakima Valley Museum houses exhibits related to the region's natural and cultural history, a restored soda fountain, and periodic special exhibitions. Downtown Yakima's historic Capitol Theatre and Seasons Performance Hall, as well as the West-side's Allied Arts Center, present numerous musical and stage productions. Larson Gallery housed at Yakima Valley College present six diverse art exhibitions each year. The city is home to the Yakima Symphony Orchestra. The Yakima Area Arboretum is a botanical garden featuring species of both native and adapted non-native plants. Popular music tours, trade shows, and other large events are hosted at the Yakima SunDome in State Fair Park.

Festivals and fairs
 Central Washington State Fair, held each year in late September at State Fair Park.
 Yakima Folklife Festival, held the second week of July at Franklin Park.
 Fresh Hop Ale Festival, held each October in Downtown Yakima.
 A Case of the Blues and All That Jazz, held in August in Sarg Hubbard Park.

Sports

 The Yakima Mavericks are a minor league football team in the Pacific Football League and play at Marquette Stadium.
 The Yakima Beetles American Legion baseball team, 3-time World Champions.
 The Yakima Canines of the American West Football Conference.
 The Yakima Valley Pippins are a collegiate wood bat baseball team that play in the West Coast League.
Former professional teams
 The Yakima Valley Warriors were an indoor football team. Play ended in 2010.
 The Yakima Sun Kings was a Continental Basketball Association franchise that won 5 CBA championships and disbanded in 2008. The team was reinstituted in 2018 as part of the North American Premier Basketball league.
 The Yakima Bears minor league baseball team, moved to Hillsboro, Oregon after the 2011 season.
 The Yakima Reds soccer team played in the USL Premier Development League, disbanded in 2010.

Government
Yakima is one of the ten first class cities, those with a population over 10,000 at the time of reorganization and operating under a home rule charter.

The Yakima City Council operates under the council–manager form of government. The city council has seven members, elected by district and the mayor is elected by the council members. Yakima's City Manager serves under the direction of the City Council, and administers and coordinates the delivery of municipal services. The city of Yakima is a full-service city, providing police, fire, water and wastewater treatment, parks, public works, planning, street maintenance, code enforcement, airport and transit to residents.

In 1994 and 2015, the City of Yakima received the All-America City Award, given by the National Civic League. Ten U.S. cities receive this award per year.

The city council was elected at-large until a 2012 lawsuit filed by the American Civil Liberties Union was ruled in the favor of Latino constituents on the grounds of racial discrimination. The current city manager is Alex Meyerhoff, who was hired as an interim manager in November 2019.

The citizens of Yakima are represented in the Washington Senate by Republicans Curtis King in District 14, and Jim Honeyford in District 15, and in the Washington House of Representatives by Republicans Chris Corry and Gina Mosbrucker in District 14, and Republicans Bruce Chandler and Jeremie Dufault in District 15.

At the national level, Yakima is part of Washington's US Congressional 4th District, currently represented by Republican Dan Newhouse.

Education
The city of Yakima has three K–12 public school districts, several private schools, and three post-secondary schools.

High schools

Public schools
There are four high schools in the Yakima School District:
 Davis High School, a 4A high school with about 2,100 students
 Eisenhower High School, a 4A high school with about 2,300 students
 Stanton Academy
 Yakima Online High School

Outside the city:
 West Valley High School, in the West Valley School District, is a division 4A school with a student population of around 1,500.
 East Valley High School, just east of Terrace Heights on the city's eastern side, is in the East Valley School District. It is a 2A school with about 1,000 students.

Private schools
 La Salle High School in Union Gap is a Catholic high school in the 1A division and enrolls about 200 students.
 Riverside Christian School, near East Valley High School, is a private K–12 Christian school. Riverside Christian is a 1B school with around 400 students in grades K–12.

Post-secondary schools
Yakima Valley College (YVC) is one of the oldest community colleges in the state of Washington. Founded in 1928, YVC is a public, four-year institution of higher education, and part of one of the most comprehensive community college systems in the nation. It offers programs in adult basic education, English as a Second Language, lower-division arts and sciences, professional and technical education, transfer degrees to in-state universities, and community services.

Perry Technical Institute is a private, nonprofit school of higher learning located in the city since 1939. Perry students learn trades such as automotive technology, instrumentation, information technology, HVAC, electrical, machining, office administration, medical coding, and legal assistant/paralegal.

Pacific Northwest University of Health Sciences opened in the fall of 2008, and graduated its first class of osteopathic physicians (D.O.) in 2012. The first college on the  campus is home to the first medical school approved in the Pacific Northwest in over 60 years, and trains physicians with an osteopathic emphasis. The school's mission is to train primary-care physicians committed to serving rural and underserved communities throughout the Pacific Northwest. It is housed in a state-of-the-art  facility.

Media

The Yakima Herald-Republic is the primary daily newspaper in the area.

According to Arbitron, the Yakima metropolitan area is the 197th largest radio market in the US, serving 196,500 people.

Yakima is part of the U.S.'s 114th largest television viewing market, which includes viewers in Pasco, Richland and Kennewick.

Transportation

Roads and highways

Interstate 82 is the main freeway through the Yakima Valley, connecting the region to Ellensburg and the Tri-Cities, with onward connections to Seattle and Oregon. U.S. Route 12 crosses northern Yakima, joining I-82 and U.S. Route 97 along the east side of the city. State Route 24 terminates in Yakima and is the primary means of reaching Moxee City and agricultural areas to the east. State Route 821 terminates in northern Yakima and traverses the Yakima River canyon, providing an alternate route to Ellensburg that bypasses the I-82 summit at Manastash Ridge.

Public transport
City-owned Yakima Transit serves Yakima, Selah, West Valley and Terrace Heights, as well as several daily trips to Ellensburg. There are also free intercity bus systems between adjacent Union Gap and nearby Toppenish, Wapato, White Swan, and Ellensburg.

Airport
Yakima is served by the Yakima Air Terminal, a municipal airport located on the southern edge of the city and is used for general aviation and commercial air service. The FAA identifier is YKM. It has two asphalt runways: 9/27 is 7,604 by 150 feet (2,318 x 46 m) and 4/22 is 3,835 by 150 feet (1,169 x 46 m). Yakima Air Terminal is owned and operated by the city.

Yakima is served by one scheduled air carrier (Alaska Airlines) and two non-scheduled carriers (Sun Country Airlines and Xtra Airways). Alaska Airlines provides multiple daily flights to and from Seattle-Tacoma International Airport, Sun Country Airlines provide charter flights to Laughlin, NV and Xtra Airways provide charter flights to Wendover, NV. During World War II the airfield was used by the United States Army Air Forces.

The airport at is home to numerous private aircraft, and is a test site for military jets and Boeing test flights.

In popular culture
The film The Hanging Tree (1959) was shot entirely in and around Yakima.

Notable people

 Oleta Adams, singer
 Jamie Allen, Major League Baseball player
 Colleen Atwood, Academy Award-winning costume designer
 Mario Batali, celebrity chef
 Wanda E. Brunstetter, author
 Bryan Caraway, mixed martial artist
 Raymond Carver, author, poet and screenwriter
 William Charbonneau, founder of Tree Top Apple Juice
 Beverly Cleary, author
 Harlond Clift, Major League Baseball player
 Cary Conklin, NFL football player
 Alex Deccio, Politician. Former member of Washington House of Representatives and Washington State Senate.
 Garret Dillahunt, actor
 Dan Doornink, NFL football player
 William O. Douglas, U.S. Supreme Court Associate Justice
 Dave Edler, Major League Baseball player, Yakima Mayor
 Mary Jo Estep, teacher, last survivor of the Battle of Kelley Creek
 Gabriel E. Gomez, politician and former Navy SEAL
 Kathryn Gustafson, artist
 Gordon Haines, NASCAR driver
 Scott Hatteberg, Major League Baseball player
 Joe Hipp, professional boxer
 Al Hoptowit, NFL football player
 Damon Huard, NFL football player
 Robert Ivers, actor
 Harry Jefferson, NASCAR driver
 Marshall Kent, professional ten-pin bowler
 Sam Kinison, actor and comedian
 Larry Knechtel, Grammy Award-winning musician
 Cooper Kupp, NFL football player
 Craig Kupp, NFL football player
 Jake Kupp, NFL football player
 Mark Labberton, seminary president
 Donald A. Larson, World War II flying ace
 Robert Lucas Jr., Nobel prize-winning economist
 Paige Mackenzie, professional golfer
 Josh Pearce, Major League Baseball Player
 Kyle MacLachlan, film and television actor
 Debbie Macomber, author
 Phil Mahre, Olympic gold medalist and world champion skier
 Steve Mahre, Olympic silver medalist and world champion skier
 Barbara La Marr, actress and writer
 Mitch Meluskey, Major League Baseball player
 Colleen Miller, actress
 Don Mosebar, NFL football player
 James "Jimmy" Nolan Jr., former host of Uncle Jimmy's Clubhouse
 Arvo Ojala, actor and artist
 Joe Parsons, snowmobiler
 Floyd Paxton, inventor of the Kwik Lok bread clip
 Steve Pelluer, NFL football player
 Jim Pomeroy, professional motocross racer and member of the AMA Motorcycle Hall of Fame
 Gary Puckett, singer, 1960s pop artist of Gary Puckett & The Union Gap
 Pete Rademacher, Olympic and professional boxer
 Monte Rawlins, actor
 Jim Rohn, entrepreneur
 Will Sampson, actor and artist
 Kurt Schulz, NFL football player
 Mel Stottlemyre, Major League Baseball player and coach
 Mel Stottlemyre Jr., Major League Baseball player
 Todd Stottlemyre, Major League Baseball player
 Thelma Johnson Streat, artist
 Taylor Stubblefield, football player
 Miesha Tate, mixed martial artist
 Willie Turner, sprinter
 Janet Waldo, actress
 Bob Wells, baseball player
 Christopher Wiehl, actor
 Lis Wiehl, author and legal analyst
 Jon Westling, 8th president of Boston University
 Chief Yowlachie, Native American actor
 Gary Peacock, Jazz double bassist

Sister cities
  Morelia, Michoacán, Mexico
  Itayanagi, Aomori, Japan

See also
 
Japantown

References

Further reading
 Available online through the Washington State Library's Classics in Washington History collection

External links

 Official website

 
1847 establishments in Oregon Country
Cities in Washington (state)
Cities in Yakima County, Washington
County seats in Washington (state)
Populated places established in 1847
Populated places on the Yakima River
Washington placenames of Native American origin